Khaneshan (also Romanized as Khāneshān and Khān-e Shān; also known as Khānīshān) is a village in Tala Tappeh Rural District, Nazlu District, Urmia County, West Azerbaijan Province, Iran. At the 2006 census, its population was 448, in 129 families.

References 

Populated places in Urmia County